Single Handed is a 1923 American silent Western film directed by Edward Sedgwick and featuring Hoot Gibson.

Cast
 Hoot Gibson as Hector MacKnight
 Elinor Field as Ruth Randolph
 Percy Challenger as Professor Weighoff
 William Steele as Windy Smith
 Philip Sleeman as Gypsy Joe
 Dick La Reno as Sheriff Simpel
 Mack V. Wright as Milo
 Tom McGuire as Macklin
 Gordon McGregor as The Boss
 W.T. McCulley as Ringmaster
 Charles Murphy as Foreman (credited as C.B. Murphy)
 Robert McKenzie as Manager (credited as Bob McKenzie)
 Sidney De Gray as Rancher (credited as Sidney De Grey)

See also
 Hoot Gibson filmography

References

External links
 

1923 films
1923 Western (genre) films
American black-and-white films
Silent American Western (genre) films
Universal Pictures films
Films directed by Edward Sedgwick
1920s American films
1920s English-language films